The Dolby SR (Spectral Recording) noise reduction format was developed by Dolby Laboratories and has been in common use in professional audio since 1986 and in cinema audio since the late 1980s. It is a revised version of Dolby's earlier formats, combining aspects of Dolby A, B and C (e.g., sliding band and fixed band companders) to improve the dynamic range (i.e., the range in decibels between peak level and noise floor) of analogue recordings and transmissions by as much as 25 dB.

Dolby SR is used in many modern professional audio analogue (i.e., tape) recordings by recording and postproduction engineers, broadcasters, and other audio professionals. It is used as the optical analog format on almost all 35mm film release prints, and is always the accompanying optical analog format when Dolby Digital is present.

Dolby SR was originally implemented in Dolby's Cat. 280 card, which was pin-compatible with the Cat. 22 A-type noise reduction card. Thus, devices that took the Cat. 22 card could be upgraded from A to SR by replacing the Cat. 22 with the Cat. 280. The Cat. 280 card functions in many devices including Dolby's Model 361 frame. Some Dolby Cinema processors require a special version, the Cat. 280T, which functions for decoding (playback) only.

References

See also
Dolby noise-reduction system
Dolby Surround
Dolby Digital

Noise reduction systems
Dolby Laboratories
Audiovisual introductions in 1986
American brands

de:Dolby#Dolby SR